William Wallace McCammon (May 28, 1838 – March 27, 1903) was a soldier in the Union Army who received the Medal of Honor for his actions during the American Civil War.

Biography
He obtained the award for his service as 1st Lieutenant in Company E, 24th Missouri Infantry. He was Provost marshal of the company. During the fighting at Corinth, Mississippi, on October 3, 1862 (the Second Battle of Corinth), after great losses to his company, he voluntarily assumed command and continued to lead until the repulse and retreat of the enemy forces the next day. The award was not issued until July 9, 1896. He made a career in the army, rose to the rank of Major, and also served in the Spanish–American War.   He was a companion of the Oregon Commandery of the Military Order of the Loyal Legion of the United States.

He died 19 1903 in Vancouver, Washington, and was buried at the Fort Vancouver Military Cemetery.

See also

 List of Medal of Honor recipients
 List of American Civil War Medal of Honor recipients: M–P

References

 Historical Register and Dictionary of the US Army

1838 births
1903 deaths
Union Army officers
United States Army officers
United States Army Medal of Honor recipients
American military personnel of the Spanish–American War
American Civil War recipients of the Medal of Honor
Military personnel from Pennsylvania
Burials in Washington (state)